Al Naser Wings Airlines, formerly known as Al-Naser Airlines, was a small Iraqi airline based in Karrada, Baghdad, Iraq. The airline operated scheduled domestic flights to places in the Middle East, mostly to Damascus, Syria. On 24 February 2019, Al Naser Wings filed for bankruptcy, and on 16 April 2019, the airline ceased all flight operations.

History

Al-Naser Airlines is registered with the Civil Aviation Authority of Iraq to hold an air operator's certificate. It started operating in 2005 for the US military in Iraq, and in 2009 entered the civil sector operating its first flight to Kuwait in February 2009. In 2017 Al-Naser Airlines was renamed Al Naser Wings Airlines.

Destinations
Prior to closing, Al-Naser offered flights to the following destinations:

Fleet

The Al Naser Wings Airlines fleet consisted of the following aircraft as of August 2017:

Previously operated
 Airbus A340-600
 Airbus A340-300
 Boeing 737-200
 Boeing 767-223

References

External links

Al-Naser Airlines Fleet

Defunct airlines of Iraq
Airlines established in 2005
Airlines disestablished in 2019
Companies based in Baghdad
Iraqi companies established in 2005
2019 disestablishments in Iraq